Chararic may refer to two early Germanic kings, both mentioned by Gregory of Tours:
Chararic (Frankish king), reigned from sometime before 486 until his death sometime after 507
Chararic (Suebian king), reigned c. 550 – 558/559